Barnet is a surname. Notable people with the surname include:

Barry Barnet (born 1961), Canadian politician
Boris Barnet (1902–1965), Soviet film director
Charlie Barnet (1913–1991), American jazz saxophonist
Horace Barnet (1856–1941), English footballer
James Barnet (1827–1904), British colonial architect
John Barnet (14th century), English bishop
Jonathan Barnet (18th century), English privateer
José Agripino Barnet (1864–1945), Cuban politician
Melvin L. Barnet (1914–1998), American newspaper editor
Miguel Barnet (born 1940), Cuban novelist
Nahum Barnet (1855–1931), Australian architect
Olga Barnet (1951–2021), Russian actress
Richard Barnet (1929–2004), American activist
Vern Barnet (born 1942), American Unitarian Universalist pastor
Will Barnet (1911–2012), American artist

See also
Barnett
Burnett (surname)

English-language surnames